GlobalStem, Inc. is a biotechnology company based in Rockville, Maryland.

GlobalStem is a provider of laboratory products and services for the stem cell research community. The company is based in Rockville, Maryland and serves an international base of academic, private industry and government customers. The company was founded in 2006 by a team of stem cell researchers who desired to bring to market better quality and more standardized research tools. GlobalStem is engaged in collaborative and strategic partnerships with a number of major companies in the stem cell research field, and is a leading resource center to foster the advancement of human embryonic stem cell research.

Globalstem, Inc. was acquired by Molecular Transfer, Inc. in 2009. In 2015, the newly organized company was rebranded as MTI-GlobalStem.

MTI-GlobalStem was subsequently acquired by Thermo Fisher Scientific in late 2016.

Products
Fully characterized Stem cells
ES-qualified Mouse Feeder Cells and Human Feeder Cells
Proprietary growth media for ES culture
ES-qualified Fetal Bovine Serum and Medium Supplements
iPSC- human induced pluripotent stem cells and culture reagents
Transfection and Protein production Tools
Characterization services

References

External links
Official website

Biotechnology companies of the United States
Companies based in Gaithersburg, Maryland